The Hempel Hotel was a luxury 5-star hotel in London, England. It was located at 31-35 Craven Hill Gardens to the north of Hyde Park off Bayswater Road. It was a small boutique hotel with Zen inspiration, designed by Anouska Hempel. The design of each of the 40 rooms and 10 apartments centered on minimalistic art and the color white, and it also featured a zen garden.

The hotel was a favourite of Victoria Beckham and of Michael Jackson, who reserved the entire hotel during a stay there in 2006.

The hotel was sold in January 2013 to British Land before being demolished to make way for 18 luxury apartments, opened in 2016.

References

External links
Official site

Defunct hotels in London
Bayswater